Skeletocutis stellae is a species of fungus belonging to the family Polyporaceae.

It is native to Eurasia and Northern America.
S. stellae is found growing on spruce and pine, mostly in old-growth, undisturbed forest habitats. (Kotiranta & Niemelä 1996, Niemelä 1998).

References

Polyporales